Gianguido Milanesi (born 26 January 1935) is an Italian fencer. He competed in the team foil event at the 1964 Summer Olympics.

References

External links
 

1935 births
Living people
Fencers from Milan
Italian male fencers
Olympic fencers of Italy
Fencers at the 1964 Summer Olympics